The golden palm civet (Paradoxurus zeylonensis) is a viverrid endemic to Sri Lanka. It is listed as Vulnerable on the IUCN Red List. Its distribution is severely fragmented, and the extent and quality of its habitat in Sri Lanka's hill regions are declining.

The golden palm civet was described by Peter Simon Pallas in 1778.

Taxonomy
Viverra zeylonensis was the scientific name proposed by Peter Simon Pallas in 1778 for a palm civet specimen from Sri Lanka. Between the 19th and early 21st centuries, several zoological specimens were described, including:
Paradoxurus aureus by Frédéric Cuvier in 1822
Paradoxurus montanus by Edward Frederick Kelaart in 1852 who described a fulvous brown palm civet from the mountains of Sri Lanka, which he considered a variety of the golden palm civet.
Paradoxurus stenocephalus by Colin Groves and colleagues in 2009 who described a golden brown specimen from Sri Lanka's dry zone. They proposed to regard P. montanus, P. aureus and P. stenocephalus as distinct species based on coat colour and skull measurements of specimens.

Genetic analysis indicates that specimens of P. montanus, P. aureus and P. stenocephalus share the same haplotype. Because of their low genetic difference, they should neither be considered distinct species nor subspecies, but junior synonyms of the golden palm civet.

Characteristics 

The golden palm civet is gold to golden brown on the upper side and paler gold on the belly. Individuals vary from dark sepia to ochreous, rusty or golden-brown. The tips of the contour hairs are frequently lustrous, sometimes greyish. The legs are about the same tint as the back, but the tail and the face are sometimes noticeably paler, buffy-grey. The face does not have a pattern, and the vibrissae are dirty white. The hair in front of the shoulders radiates from two whorls and grows forward along the sides of the neck and the nape to the head. It also grows forward on the fore throat, radiating from a single whorl. The dorsal pattern consists of faint bands and spots that are slightly darker than the ground colour. The lower side is slightly paler and sometimes greyer than the upper.
The golden palm civet has two morphs — one golden and one dark brown. Specimens from montane areas are darker, slightly greyish-toned wood-brown, and paler on the underside with a yellowish-white tail tip.

The rounded ears have hairless edges. The eyes are large with vertical pupils. It emits a pleasant odour from anal glands, which is reminiscent of Michelia champaca flowers.

Distribution and habitat 
The golden palm civet inhabits lowland rain forest, montane evergreen forests, and also dense monsoon forest.

Ecology and behaviour 
The golden palm civet is forest-dependent, yet tolerant of minor habitat modification where some continuous forest remains. It is arboreal, nocturnal, and solitary; its diet consists of fruits, berries, invertebrates, and a wide range of small vertebrates.

In culture
Both golden and Asian palm civets are sometimes collectively called  in Sinhala and maranai (மரநாய்) in Tamil.

However, the word  is mostly used to refer altogether a different species, the ruddy mongoose (Herpestes smithii). Due to similar appearance and coloration, they are mistaken as the same animal.

This civet appears on the 3-rupee Sri Lankan postal stamp. However, it is labeled "Golden Palm Cat" on the stamp.

References

golden palm civet
Mammals of Sri Lanka
Endemic fauna of Sri Lanka
golden palm civet